Davidovka can mean:

 any of a large number of possible places called "Davidovka" in Ukraine, Belarus, Kazakhstan, Russia, or the former Soviet Union 
 Davidovka, Minsk, Belarus in Minsk, Belarus—one of at least two in Belarus
 Davidovka, Kazakhstan
 Davidovka concentration camp, a Hungarian-controlled World War II labor camp